Patrick Fabian (born December 7, 1964) is an American film, stage, and television actor. He is known for his role as attorney Howard Hamlin in Better Call Saul (2015–2022). His film roles include End Game (2006), The Last Exorcism (2010), Pig (2011) and Jimmy (2013).

Career
Patrick Fabian is the son of Tom and Mary Lou Fabian. He was born in Pittsburgh, and grew up in New Cumberland, Pennsylvania. His father worked for the Pennsylvania Higher Education Assistance Agency (PHEAA). He attended Penn State University and received his Bachelor of Fine Arts in Performance. He moved to California, where he earned a master's degree from California State University, Long Beach.

One of Fabian's earliest prominent roles was as Professor Jeremiah Lasky on NBC's Saved by the Bell: The College Years (1993–1994). He was in the main cast of the short-lived television series Valentine (2008–2009), Working Class (2011), and Special (2019–2021). He had recurring roles on Joan of Arcadia, Veronica Mars, Gigantic, and Big Love.

Fabian has appeared in a number of films including The Last Exorcism, and has had a number of guest appearances on high-profile TV shows including Will & Grace and Friends. Fabian was cast to play Howard Hamlin, a main role in the AMC television series, Better Call Saul.
 
Fabian's theatre work in New York includes The Food Chain by Nicky Silver, Humpty Dumpty by Eric Bogosian, Six Degrees of Separation (national tour), and, in Los Angeles, Diva by Howard Gould, and Dinner With Friends by Donald Margulies, as well as two seasons at LA's Shakespeare Festival.

Personal life

Fabian has been a member of SAG-AFTRA's National and Los Angeles Local Board of Directors, running under the Unite for Strength slate.

He is married to writer and comedian Mandy Steckelberg; the couple have two daughters.

In mid-2022, Fabian opened a Cameo account. After a request from a fan, Fabian was asked to say a number of Better Call Saul injokes and internet memes, one of which was, "The One Piece, The One Piece is real!", which itself became a viral internet video meme, intercut with characters from One Piece and Kanye West's Dark Fantasy.

Filmography

Film

Television

Awards and nominations

References

External links

1964 births
20th-century American male actors
21st-century American male actors
Male actors from Pittsburgh
American male film actors
American male soap opera actors
American male television actors
Living people
Pennsylvania State University alumni
California State University, Long Beach alumni